Polly Ann Young (October 25, 1908 – January 21, 1997) was an American actress.

Biography
Young was born in Denver, Colorado. Actresses Loretta Young and Sally Blane were her sisters. From 1917 to 1941, she was featured in over 40 movies, some of them minor, uncredited roles. Among her more notable movie roles was as John Wayne's leading lady in The Man from Utah (1934). Her last film was the Poverty Row horror movie Invisible Ghost with Bela Lugosi in 1941.

Young married Carter Hermann on February 5, 1936, and they had four children. Her husband died in the 1980s, and she died in 1997 of cancer in Los Angeles, California, aged 88. Her sisters Sally and Loretta also died of cancer. She was a half-sister to Georgiana Young, wife of actor Ricardo Montalbán. Young was a Roman Catholic, the same as her sisters and mother, and was educated in convent school.

Partial filmography

 Sirens of the Sea (1917) - Child (as a child actress)
 A Good Loser (1920)
 The Sheik (1921) - Arab Child (uncredited) (as a child actress)
 The Masks of the Devil (1928) - Dancer
 The Bellamy Trial (1929)
 Tanned Legs (1929) - Dancer (uncredited)
 Rich People (1929) - Sally Vanderwater
 They Learned About Women (1930) - Train Passenger (uncredited)
 Children of Pleasure (1930) - Society Girl at Party (uncredited)
 Our Blushing Brides (1930) - A Mannequin
 Road to Paradise (1930) - Mary / Margaret (voice, uncredited)
 Going Wild (1930) - Brunette Book Buyer (uncredited)
 Up for Murder (1931) - Winter's Daughter (uncredited)
 This Modern Age (1931) - Parisian Party Girl (uncredited)
 The One Way Trail (1931) - Mollie
 The Circus Show-Up (1932, Short) - Irene Duval
 Lady with a Past (1932) - Party Guest (uncredited)
 Murders in the Rue Morgue (1932) - Girl (uncredited)
 Disorderly Conduct (1932) - A Friend of Phyllis's (uncredited)
 Stolen Sweets (1934) - Betty Harkness
 The Man from Utah (1934) - Marjorie Carter
 Elinor Norton (1934) - Publisher's Staff (uncredited)
 The White Parade (1934) - Hannah Seymour
 Sons of Steel (1934) - Rose Mason
 The Crimson Trail (1935) - Kitty Bellair
 Happiness C.O.D. (1935) - Eleanor
 Thunder in the Night (1935) - Torok's Sweetheart (uncredited)
 His Fighting Blood (1935) - Doris Carstairs
 Hitchhike to Heaven (1936) - Jerry Daley
 The Border Patrolman (1936) - Patricia Huntley
 I Cover Chinatown (1936) - Myra Duryea
 Mystery Plane (1939) - Anita
 The Story of Alexander Graham Bell (1939) - Grace Hubbard
 Wolf Call (1939) - Natalie
 Port of Hate (1939) - Jerry Gale
 Murder on the Yukon (1940) - Joan Manning
 Turnabout (1940) - Miss Gertie Twill
 The Last Alarm (1940) - Joan Hadley
 Road Show (1941) - Helen Newton
 Invisible Ghost (1941) - Virginia Kessler (final film role)

References

External links 

1908 births
1997 deaths
20th-century American actresses
Actresses from Denver
American child actresses
American film actresses
American silent film actresses
Burials at Holy Cross Cemetery, Culver City
Deaths from cancer in California